The 1956 Pittsburgh Pirates season was the 75th season of the Pittsburgh Pirates franchise, the 70th in the National League. The Pirates finished seventh in the league standings with a record of 66–88.

Regular season

Season standings

Record vs. opponents

Game log

|- bgcolor="ffbbbb"
| 1 || April 17 || @ Giants || 3–4 || Antonelli || Friend (0–1) || — || 12,790 || 0–1
|- bgcolor="ffbbbb"
| 2 || April 18 || @ Giants || 4–5 || McCall || Law (0–1) || — || 2,493 || 0–2
|- bgcolor="ccffcc"
| 3 || April 19 || @ Giants || 3–2 || Kline (1–0) || Worthington || — || 1,922 || 1–2
|- bgcolor="ffbbbb"
| 4 || April 20 || Dodgers || 0–5 || Craig || Hall (0–1) || — || 23,357 || 1–3
|- bgcolor="ccffcc"
| 5 || April 21 || Dodgers || 3–1 || Friend (1–1) || Lehman || — || 8,603 || 2–3
|- bgcolor="ffbbbb"
| 6 || April 22 || Dodgers || 1–4 (6) || Newcombe || Law (0–2) || — || 15,264 || 2–4
|- bgcolor="ccffcc"
| 7 || April 25 || @ Phillies || 6–5 || Law (1–2) || Owens || King (1) || 5,347 || 3–4
|- bgcolor="ffbbbb"
| 8 || April 27 || @ Dodgers || 2–7 || Craig || Kline (1–1) || — || 7,056 || 3–5
|- bgcolor="ffbbbb"
| 9 || April 28 || @ Dodgers || 2–5 || Newcombe || Hall (0–2) || — || 7,806 || 3–6
|- bgcolor="ccffcc"
| 10 || April 29 || @ Dodgers || 10–1 || Friend (2–1) || Drysdale || — ||  || 4–6
|- bgcolor="ccffcc"
| 11 || April 29 || @ Dodgers || 11–3 || King (1–0) || Loes || — || 22,609 || 5–6
|-

|- bgcolor="ccffcc"
| 12 || May 1 || @ Cardinals || 4–2 || Face (1–0) || Mizell || Law (1) || 6,331 || 6–6
|- bgcolor="ffbbbb"
| 13 || May 2 || @ Cardinals || 9–10 (10) || Collum || Munger (0–1) || — || 6,382 || 6–7
|- bgcolor="ccffcc"
| 14 || May 3 || @ Redlegs || 5–1 || Friend (3–1) || Nuxhall || — || 2,561 || 7–7
|- bgcolor="ffbbbb"
| 15 || May 4 || @ Redlegs || 3–4 || Fowler || Hall (0–3) || — || 6,438 || 7–8
|- bgcolor="ffbbbb"
| 16 || May 5 || @ Redlegs || 6–7 (10) || LaPalme || King (1–1) || — || 4,481 || 7–9
|- bgcolor="ccffcc"
| 17 || May 6 || @ Cubs || 2–1 || Kline (2–1) || Minner || — ||  || 8–9
|- bgcolor="ffffff"
| 18 || May 6 || @ Cubs || 6–6 (7) ||  ||  || — || 11,426 || 8–9
|- bgcolor="ffbbbb"
| 19 || May 8 || @ Braves || 0–5 || Spahn || Friend (3–2) || — || 18,466 || 8–10
|- bgcolor="ccffcc"
| 20 || May 11 || Phillies || 6–5 || Arroyo (1–0) || Meyer || — || 17,605 || 9–10
|- bgcolor="ccffcc"
| 21 || May 12 || Phillies || 6–5 || Friend (4–2) || Roberts || King (2) || 20,115 || 10–10
|- bgcolor="ccffcc"
| 22 || May 13 || Phillies || 11–9 || Face (2–0) || Meyer || Law (2) ||  || 11–10
|- bgcolor="ffbbbb"
| 23 || May 13 || Phillies || 2–7 || Rogovin || Hall (0–4) || Roberts || 20,435 || 11–11
|- bgcolor="ccffcc"
| 24 || May 16 || Redlegs || 9–2 || Friend (5–2) || Nuxhall || — || 3,053 || 12–11
|- bgcolor="ffbbbb"
| 25 || May 17 || Cubs || 1–4 || Meyer || Kline (2–2) || Lown || 6,627 || 12–12
|- bgcolor="ffbbbb"
| 26 || May 18 || Cubs || 2–3 || Lown || Face (2–1) || — || 10,382 || 12–13
|- bgcolor="ccffcc"
| 27 || May 19 || Cubs || 7–4 || King (2–1) || Jones || Face (1) || 6,863 || 13–13
|- bgcolor="ccffcc"
| 28 || May 20 || Braves || 6–3 || Friend (6–2) || Crone || — ||  || 14–13
|- bgcolor="ccffcc"
| 29 || May 20 || Braves || 5–0 || Kline (3–2) || Spahn || — || 32,346 || 15–13
|- bgcolor="ffbbbb"
| 30 || May 22 || Cardinals || 3–6 || Wehmeier || Law (1–3) || Collum || 19,316 || 15–14
|- bgcolor="ccffcc"
| 31 || May 23 || Cardinals || 6–0 || Friend (7–2) || Schmidt || — || 19,917 || 16–14
|- bgcolor="ccffcc"
| 32 || May 25 || @ Phillies || 8–5 || King (3–1) || Simmons || Munger (1) || 10,407 || 17–14
|- bgcolor="ccffcc"
| 33 || May 26 || @ Phillies || 6–2 || Law (2–3) || Miller || — || 4,614 || 18–14
|- bgcolor="ccffcc"
| 34 || May 28 || Dodgers || 3–2 || Friend (8–2) || Erskine || — || 32,221 || 19–14
|- bgcolor="ffbbbb"
| 35 || May 29 || Dodgers || 1–10 || Newcombe || Kline (3–3) || — || 11,935 || 19–15
|- bgcolor="ccffcc"
| 36 || May 30 || Giants || 5–4 (10) || Face (3–1) || McCall || — ||  || 20–15
|- bgcolor="ffbbbb"
| 37 || May 30 || Giants || 3–5 (15) || Antonelli || Law (2–4) || — || 27,680 || 20–16
|- bgcolor="ccffcc"
| 38 || May 31 || Giants || 3–0 (8) || Kline (4–3) || Hearn || — || 15,123 || 21–16
|-

|- bgcolor="ccffcc"
| 39 || June 1 || @ Braves || 4–1 || Friend (9–2) || Spahn || King (3) || 24,528 || 22–16
|- bgcolor="ccffcc"
| 40 || June 2 || @ Braves || 4–2 || Munger (1–1) || Conley || Kline (1) || 27,650 || 23–16
|- bgcolor="ccffcc"
| 41 || June 3 || @ Braves || 3–1 || Face (4–1) || Crone || King (4) ||  || 24–16
|- bgcolor="ffbbbb"
| 42 || June 3 || @ Braves || 3–4 || Buhl || Law (2–5) || — || 34,915 || 24–17
|- bgcolor="ffbbbb"
| 43 || June 5 || @ Cubs || 3–7 || Hacker || Friend (9–3) || — || 7,847 || 24–18
|- bgcolor="ccffcc"
| 44 || June 6 || @ Cubs || 8–2 || Kline (5–3) || Minner || — || 7,545 || 25–18
|- bgcolor="ffbbbb"
| 45 || June 7 || @ Cubs || 2–5 || Rush || Face (4–2) || — || 4,535 || 25–19
|- bgcolor="ccffcc"
| 46 || June 8 || @ Cardinals || 2–0 (11) || Friend (10–3) || Dickson || — || 20,079 || 26–19
|- bgcolor="ffbbbb"
| 47 || June 9 || @ Cardinals || 3–8 || Mizell || Law (2–6) || Konstanty || 12,149 || 26–20
|- bgcolor="ccffcc"
| 48 || June 10 || @ Cardinals || 11–3 || Arroyo (2–0) || Schmidt || — ||  || 27–20
|- bgcolor="ffbbbb"
| 49 || June 10 || @ Cardinals || 0–3 || Wehmeier || Kline (5–4) || — || 28,129 || 27–21
|- bgcolor="ccffcc"
| 50 || June 12 || @ Redlegs || 4–3 || Face (5–2) || Nuxhall || King (5) || 15,919 || 28–21
|- bgcolor="ccffcc"
| 51 || June 15 || Cardinals || 12–1 || Kline (6–4) || Mizell || — || 26,276 || 29–21
|- bgcolor="ccffcc"
| 52 || June 16 || Cardinals || 2–0 (7) || Friend (11–3) || Wehmeier || — || 14,550 || 30–21
|- bgcolor="ffbbbb"
| 53 || June 17 || Cardinals || 1–3 || Poholsky || Law (2–7) || — ||  || 30–22
|- bgcolor="ffbbbb"
| 54 || June 17 || Cardinals || 3–8 || Schmidt || Arroyo (2–1) || Konstanty || 30,127 || 30–23
|- bgcolor="ffbbbb"
| 55 || June 18 || Braves || 2–3 || Spahn || Kline (6–5) || — || 16,735 || 30–24
|- bgcolor="ffbbbb"
| 56 || June 19 || Braves || 3–5 || Burdette || Friend (11–4) || Sleater || 23,743 || 30–25
|- bgcolor="ffbbbb"
| 57 || June 20 || Braves || 3–7 || Conley || Law (2–8) || — || 19,775 || 30–26
|- bgcolor="ffbbbb"
| 58 || June 21 || Braves || 2–7 || Buhl || Kline (6–6) || — || 8,292 || 30–27
|- bgcolor="ffbbbb"
| 59 || June 23 || Cubs || 5–9 (10) || Davis || Face (5–3) || — || 7,809 || 30–28
|- bgcolor="ffbbbb"
| 60 || June 24 || Cubs || 3–5 || Valentinetti || Face (5–4) || — ||  || 30–29
|- bgcolor="ccffcc"
| 61 || June 24 || Cubs || 1–0 (6) || Pepper (1–0) || Jones || Arroyo (1) || 17,066 || 31–29
|- bgcolor="ffbbbb"
| 62 || June 25 || Redlegs || 1–2 || Fowler || Kline (6–7) || — || 17,007 || 31–30
|- bgcolor="ffbbbb"
| 63 || June 27 || Redlegs || 2–10 || Lawrence || Friend (11–5) || Freeman || 24,353 || 31–31
|- bgcolor="ffbbbb"
| 64 || June 28 || Redlegs || 3–4 || Acker || Arroyo (2–2) || Fowler || 9,915 || 31–32
|- bgcolor="ccffcc"
| 65 || June 29 || Giants || 6–3 || Law (3–8) || Hearn || Face (2) || 18,797 || 32–32
|- bgcolor="ffbbbb"
| 66 || June 30 || Giants || 4–6 || Gomez || Kline (6–8) || Wilhelm || 8,111 || 32–33
|-

|- bgcolor="ffbbbb"
| 67 || July 1 || Giants || 2–3 || Antonelli || Friend (11–6) || Grissom ||  || 32–34
|- bgcolor="ffbbbb"
| 68 || July 1 || Giants || 6–7 || McCall || Arroyo (2–3) || Grissom || 23,459 || 32–35
|- bgcolor="ccffcc"
| 69 || July 3 || Phillies || 6–5 || O'Brien (1–0) || Meyer || — || 5,804 || 33–35
|- bgcolor="ffbbbb"
| 70 || July 4 || Phillies || 2–4 || Haddix || Kline (6–9) || — ||  || 33–36
|- bgcolor="ccffcc"
| 71 || July 4 || Phillies || 8–4 || Face (6–4) || Miller || — || 16,076 || 34–36
|- bgcolor="ffbbbb"
| 72 || July 7 || @ Giants || 2–3 || Antonelli || Friend (11–7) || Wilhelm || 7,151 || 34–37
|- bgcolor="ffbbbb"
| 73 || July 8 || @ Giants || 1–11 || Gomez || Law (3–9) || — ||  || 34–38
|- bgcolor="ccffcc"
| 74 || July 8 || @ Giants || 5–2 || Kline (7–9) || Worthington || Face (3) || 15,406 || 35–38
|- bgcolor="ccffcc"
| 75 || July 12 || @ Cubs || 2–1 || Kline (8–9) || Kaiser || — ||  || 36–38
|- bgcolor="ccffcc"
| 76 || July 12 || @ Cubs || 5–4 || Face (7–4) || Jones || — || 10,077 || 37–38
|- bgcolor="ffbbbb"
| 77 || July 13 || @ Cubs || 6–7 || Lown || Friend (11–8) || — || 6,958 || 37–39
|- bgcolor="ffbbbb"
| 78 || July 14 || @ Cubs || 2–6 || Rush || Law (3–10) || — ||  || 37–40
|- bgcolor="ffbbbb"
| 79 || July 14 || @ Cubs || 5–6 (10) || Lown || Face (7–5) || — || 17,195 || 37–41
|- bgcolor="ffbbbb"
| 80 || July 15 || @ Braves || 2–3 || Spahn || Law (3–11) || — ||  || 37–42
|- bgcolor="ffbbbb"
| 81 || July 15 || @ Braves || 1–4 || Phillips || Naranjo (0–1) || — || 35,631 || 37–43
|- bgcolor="ffbbbb"
| 82 || July 16 || @ Braves || 1–2 || Buhl || Kline (8–10) || — || 20,124 || 37–44
|- bgcolor="ccffcc"
| 83 || July 17 || @ Cardinals || 4–2 (10) || Friend (12–8) || Wehmeier || Face (4) || 12,182 || 38–44
|- bgcolor="ffffff"
| 84 || July 18 || @ Cardinals || 1–1 ||  ||  || — || 15,195 || 38–44
|- bgcolor="ffbbbb"
| 85 || July 20 || @ Redlegs || 4–6 (12) || Klippstein || Waters (0–1) || — || 19,342 || 38–45
|- bgcolor="ccffcc"
| 86 || July 21 || @ Redlegs || 4–3 || Face (8–5) || Lawrence || — || 8,859 || 39–45
|- bgcolor="ccffcc"
| 87 || July 22 || @ Redlegs || 8–6 || Munger (2–1) || Freeman || — ||  || 40–45
|- bgcolor="ffbbbb"
| 88 || July 22 || @ Redlegs || 2–9 || Nuxhall || Pollet (0–1) || Acker || 28,505 || 40–46
|- bgcolor="ffbbbb"
| 89 || July 23 || @ Redlegs || 3–4 || Lawrence || Face (8–6) || Freeman || 11,318 || 40–47
|- bgcolor="ccffcc"
| 90 || July 24 || Cubs || 6–2 || Kline (9–10) || Rush || — || 12,861 || 41–47
|- bgcolor="ccffcc"
| 91 || July 25 || Cubs || 9–8 || King (4–1) || Brosnan || — || 12,861 || 42–47
|- bgcolor="ccffcc"
| 92 || July 26 || Cubs || 4–0 || Waters (1–1) || Jones || Pollet (1) || 7,121 || 43–47
|- bgcolor="ffbbbb"
| 93 || July 27 || Redlegs || 2–3 || Fowler || Face (8–7) || — || 31,494 || 43–48
|- bgcolor="ffbbbb"
| 94 || July 28 || Redlegs || 3–8 || Klippstein || Pollet (0–2) || — || 10,166 || 43–49
|- bgcolor="ffbbbb"
| 95 || July 29 || Redlegs || 1–6 || Lawrence || Friend (12–9) || — ||  || 43–50
|- bgcolor="ffbbbb"
| 96 || July 29 || Redlegs || 2–3 || Freeman || Law (3–12) || — || 30,429 || 43–51
|- bgcolor="ffbbbb"
| 97 || July 30 || Redlegs || 2–4 || Freeman || Pepper (1–1) || — || 11,256 || 43–52
|- bgcolor="ffbbbb"
| 98 || July 31 || Cardinals || 0–7 || Dickson || Munger (2–2) || — || 10,965 || 43–53
|-

|- bgcolor="ffbbbb"
| 99 || August 1 || Cardinals || 1–4 || Schmidt || Kline (9–11) || — || 8,592 || 43–54
|- bgcolor="ffbbbb"
| 100 || August 2 || Cardinals || 5–7 || Wehmeier || Friend (12–10) || Jackson || 5,745 || 43–55
|- bgcolor="ccffcc"
| 101 || August 3 || Braves || 4–3 || Law (4–12) || Spahn || — || 17,479 || 44–55
|- bgcolor="ffbbbb"
| 102 || August 4 || Braves || 3–7 || Trowbridge || Pollet (0–3) || — || 7,494 || 44–56
|- bgcolor="ffbbbb"
| 103 || August 5 || Braves || 1–5 || Conley || Kline (9–12) || Johnson ||  || 44–57
|- bgcolor="ffbbbb"
| 104 || August 5 || Braves || 0–5 (5) || Burdette || Friend (12–11) || — || 18,004 || 44–58
|- bgcolor="ffbbbb"
| 105 || August 7 || @ Dodgers || 0–3 || Newcombe || Law (4–13) || — || 17,504 || 44–59
|- bgcolor="ccffcc"
| 106 || August 8 || Dodgers || 8–5 || Munger (3–2) || Craig || Kline (2) || 18,612 || 45–59
|- bgcolor="ffbbbb"
| 107 || August 9 || Dodgers || 3–7 || Roebuck || Hall (0–5) || — || 7,486 || 45–60
|- bgcolor="ccffcc"
| 108 || August 10 || Giants || 3–2 || Friend (13–11) || Littlefield || — || 8,234 || 46–60
|- bgcolor="ffbbbb"
| 109 || August 11 || Giants || 2–4 || Antonelli || Kline (9–13) || Hearn || 5,655 || 46–61
|- bgcolor="ccffcc"
| 110 || August 12 || Giants || 3–2 || Law (5–13) || Gomez || — ||  || 47–61
|- bgcolor="ccffcc"
| 111 || August 12 || Giants || 11–3 || Waters (2–1) || McCall || — || 9,552 || 48–61
|- bgcolor="ffbbbb"
| 112 || August 14 || @ Phillies || 0–3 || Haddix || Friend (13–12) || — ||  || 48–62
|- bgcolor="ffbbbb"
| 113 || August 14 || @ Phillies || 2–11 || Simmons || Munger (3–3) || — || 32,873 || 48–63
|- bgcolor="ccffcc"
| 114 || August 15 || @ Phillies || 5–1 || Kline (10–13) || Meyer || — || 12,337 || 49–63
|- bgcolor="ccffcc"
| 115 || August 16 || @ Phillies || 4–1 || Law (6–13) || Roberts || — || 7,070 || 50–63
|- bgcolor="ffbbbb"
| 116 || August 17 || @ Giants || 3–5 || Margoneri || Munger (3–4) || McCall || 5,998 || 50–64
|- bgcolor="ccffcc"
| 117 || August 18 || @ Giants || 9–1 || Friend (14–12) || Gomez || — || 4,955 || 51–64
|- bgcolor="ffbbbb"
| 118 || August 19 || @ Giants || 6–7 || Wilhelm || Hall (0–6) || — ||  || 51–65
|- bgcolor="ffbbbb"
| 119 || August 19 || @ Giants || 2–3 || Antonelli || Kline (10–14) || McCall || 8,587 || 51–66
|- bgcolor="ffbbbb"
| 120 || August 21 || @ Redlegs || 4–7 || Freeman || Pollet (0–4) || — || 8,267 || 51–67
|- bgcolor="ffbbbb"
| 121 || August 22 || @ Redlegs || 3–6 || Nuxhall || Friend (14–13) || Jeffcoat || 8,076 || 51–68
|- bgcolor="ffbbbb"
| 122 || August 23 || @ Cardinals || 0–3 || Mizell || Kline (10–15) || — ||  || 51–69
|- bgcolor="ffbbbb"
| 123 || August 23 || @ Cardinals || 2–3 || Collum || Face (8–8) || — || 11,935 || 51–70
|- bgcolor="ffbbbb"
| 124 || August 24 || @ Cardinals || 2–6 || Dickson || Waters (2–2) || — || 9,317 || 51–71
|- bgcolor="ffbbbb"
| 125 || August 25 || @ Cardinals || 5–8 || Blaylock || Law (6–14) || Jackson || 8,976 || 51–72
|- bgcolor="ccffcc"
| 126 || August 26 || @ Cubs || 2–0 || Friend (15–13) || Rush || — || 10,631 || 52–72
|- bgcolor="ccffcc"
| 127 || August 26 || @ Cubs || 2–1 || Kline (11–15) || Jones || Friend (1) || 10,631 || 53–72
|- bgcolor="ccffcc"
| 128 || August 28 || @ Braves || 5–4 || Face (9–8) || Trowbridge || — || 25,778 || 54–72
|- bgcolor="ffbbbb"
| 129 || August 29 || @ Braves || 1–4 || Burdette || Face (9–9) || — || 24,861 || 54–73
|- bgcolor="ffffff"
| 130 || August 30 || @ Braves || 1–1 (9) ||  ||  || — || 17,783 || 54–73
|- bgcolor="ccffcc"
| 131 || August 31 || Phillies || 6–3 || Kline (12–15) || Hamner || Pollet (2) || 11,147 || 55–73
|-

|- bgcolor="ffbbbb"
| 132 || September 1 || Phillies || 2–3 || Rogovin || Hall (0–7) || — || 5,071 || 55–74
|- bgcolor="ccffcc"
| 133 || September 2 || Phillies || 10–6 || Law (7–14) || Simmons || — ||  || 56–74
|- bgcolor="ccffcc"
| 134 || September 2 || Phillies || 5–1 || Naranjo (1–1) || Roberts || — || 12,470 || 57–74
|- bgcolor="ffbbbb"
| 135 || September 3 || @ Dodgers || 3–4 || Bessent || Friend (15–14) || — ||  || 57–75
|- bgcolor="ccffcc"
| 136 || September 3 || @ Dodgers || 3–2 || Face (10–9) || Drysdale || Friend (2) || 29,045 || 58–75
|- bgcolor="ffbbbb"
| 137 || September 5 || @ Dodgers || 3–4 || Maglie || Kline (12–16) || Bessent || 10,332 || 58–76
|- bgcolor="ffbbbb"
| 138 || September 7 || @ Phillies || 2–5 || Roberts || Friend (15–15) || — || 7,835 || 58–77
|- bgcolor="ccffcc"
| 139 || September 8 || @ Phillies || 5–4 || Face (11–9) || Flowers || Hall (1) || 4,806 || 59–77
|- bgcolor="ccffcc"
| 140 || September 9 || @ Phillies || 4–1 (10) || Kline (13–16) || Miller || Face (5) ||  || 60–77
|- bgcolor="ffbbbb"
| 141 || September 9 || @ Phillies || 5–6 (10) || Roberts || Naranjo (1–2) || — || 11,104 || 60–78
|- bgcolor="ccffcc"
| 142 || September 11 || Cubs || 4–3 || Face (12–9) || Lown || — || 3,987 || 61–78
|- bgcolor="ffbbbb"
| 143 || September 12 || Cubs || 0–3 || Jones || Law (7–15) || — || 3,689 || 61–79
|- bgcolor="ffbbbb"
| 144 || September 13 || Redlegs || 4–5 || Nuxhall || Face (12–10) || Freeman || 8,765 || 61–80
|- bgcolor="ffbbbb"
| 145 || September 15 || Redlegs || 4–6 || Lawrence || Friend (15–16) || Freeman || 2,654 || 61–81
|- bgcolor="ffbbbb"
| 146 || September 16 || Cardinals || 2–3 (10) || Dickson || Face (12–11) || — ||  || 61–82
|- bgcolor="ccffcc"
| 147 || September 16 || Cardinals || 9–3 || Law (8–15) || Wehmeier || — || 8,742 || 62–82
|- bgcolor="ffbbbb"
| 148 || September 18 || Braves || 4–6 || Sleater || Face (12–12) || Spahn || 9,786 || 62–83
|- bgcolor="ccffcc"
| 149 || September 20 || Braves || 2–1 (10) || Friend (16–16) || Crone || — || 1,691 || 63–83
|- bgcolor="ccffcc"
| 150 || September 21 || Dodgers || 2–1 || Kline (14–16) || Maglie || — || 10,872 || 64–83
|- bgcolor="ccffcc"
| 151 || September 22 || Dodgers || 5–1 || Arroyo (3–3) || Erskine || Friend (3) || 6,452 || 65–83
|- bgcolor="ffbbbb"
| 152 || September 23 || Dodgers || 3–8 || Newcombe || Face (12–13) || Labine || 44,932 || 65–84
|- bgcolor="ccffcc"
| 153 || September 24 || Dodgers || 6–5 || Friend (17–16) || Craig || — || 17,252 || 66–84
|- bgcolor="ffbbbb"
| 154 || September 25 || @ Giants || 0–10 || Antonelli || Kline (14–17) || Surkont || 1,275 || 66–85
|- bgcolor="ffbbbb"
| 155 || September 29 || @ Dodgers || 2–6 || Maglie || Friend (17–17) || — || 26,340 || 66–86
|- bgcolor="ffbbbb"
| 156 || September 29 || @ Dodgers || 1–3 || Labine || Kline (14–18) || — || 26,340 || 66–87
|- bgcolor="ffbbbb"
| 157 || September 30 || @ Dodgers || 6–8 || Newcombe || Law (8–16) || Bessent || 31,983 || 66–88
|-

|-
| Legend:       = Win       = Loss       = TieBold = Pirates team member

Opening Day lineup

Notable transactions 
 May 17, 1956: Dick Littlefield and Bobby Del Greco were traded by the Pirates to the St. Louis Cardinals for Bill Virdon.
 May 28, 1956: Toby Atwell was traded by the Pirates to the St. Louis Cardinals for cash and a player to be named later. The Cardinals completed the deal by sending Dick Rand to the Pirates on October 14.

Roster

Player stats

Batting

Starters by position 
Note: Pos = Position; G = Games played; AB = At bats; H = Hits; Avg. = Batting average; HR = Home runs; RBI = Runs batted in

Other batters 
Note: G = Games played; AB = At bats; H = Hits; Avg. = Batting average; HR = Home runs; RBI = Runs batted in

Pitching

Starting pitchers 
Note: G = Games pitched; IP = Innings pitched; W = Wins; L = Losses; ERA = Earned run average; SO = Strikeouts

Other pitchers 
Note: G = Games pitched; IP = Innings pitched; W = Wins; L = Losses; ERA = Earned run average; SO = Strikeouts

Relief pitchers 
Note: G = Games pitched; W = Wins; L = Losses; SV = Saves; ERA = Earned run average; SO = Strikeouts

Farm system

LEAGUE CHAMPIONS: Lincoln

Notes

References 
 1956 Pittsburgh Pirates at Baseball Reference
 1956 Pittsburgh Pirates at Baseball Almanac

Pittsburgh Pirates seasons
Pittsburgh Pirates season
Pittsburg Pir